The 1963–64 Liga Alef season saw Maccabi Netanya (champions of the North Division) and Beitar Tel Aviv (champions of the South Division) win the title and promotion to Liga Leumit.

The following season, Liga Alef expanded to 16 clubs in each division.

North Division

South Division

References
Final tables Maariv, 26.4.64, Historical Jewish Press 

Liga Alef seasons
Israel
2